Olifants/Doorn WMA, or Olifants/Doorn Water Management Area, Includes the following major rivers: the Olifants River, Doorn River, Krom River, Sand River, and Sout River, and covers the following dams:

 Bulshoek Dam Olifants River
 Clanwilliam Dam Olifants River
 Karee Dam Karee River

Boundaries 
Primary drainage region E and tertiary drainage regions G30 and F60.

See also 
 Water Management Areas
 List of reservoirs and dams in South Africa
 List of rivers of South Africa

References 
http://www.dwaf.gov.za/Hydrology/

Water Management Areas
Dams in South Africa